Norwegian county road 408 (Fylkesvei 408 or Fv408) is a  long Norwegian county road which runs between the villages of Blakstad in Froland municipality and Rykene in Arendal municipality. The road roughly follows the river Nidelva the whole way.  Prior to 2010, this was a Norwegian national road, but in the transportation reforms that year, the road was transferred to county control.

The road begins in the village of Blakstad in Froland municipality. In Froland, the road is called Messelveien. The road begins at a junction with Norwegian County Road 42 and it runs south along the Arendalsbanen railway line. The road passes through the villages of Rise and Løddesøl, Lindtveit, and finally Rykene where it ends at the junction with Norwegian County Road 407.

References

408
Road transport in Agder
Arendal